Spilios Spiliotopoulos (born in 1941 in Patras) was the Greek Minister of National Defence from May 2004 until February 2006. A graduate of the Hellenic Air Force Academy, Spiliotopoulos also holds degrees in law and philosophy.  He is a member of the New Democracy party and has been a member of parliament since 1989.  From 1992–93, he served as Deputy Minister of National Defense. On August 7, 2007, he announced that he would not participate in the 2007 election.

External links
Biography on Greek Parliament website

1941 births
Living people
Greek MPs 1989–1990
Greek MPs 1990–1993
Greek MPs 1993–1996
Greek MPs 1996–2000
Greek MPs 2000–2004
New Democracy (Greece) politicians
Ministers of National Defence of Greece
Hellenic Air Force officers
People from Patras